Stuart Banda (born 20 November 1988) is a Malawian long-distance runner. He competed in the 5000 metres at the 2015 World Championships in Beijing failing to qualify for the final.

International competitions

Personal bests
5000 metres – 14:49.31 (Beijing 2015)

References

External links
 Athletics Novice Gets the Nod for World Championship, Malawi Broadcasting Corporation
 AAM Names World Athletics Representative, The Nation

1988 births
Living people
Malawian male long-distance runners
Place of birth missing (living people)
World Athletics Championships athletes for Malawi